The following outline is provided as an overview of and topical guide to Saudi Arabia:

The Kingdom of Saudi Arabia, or  KSA, is a sovereign country that comprises the central portion of the Arabian Peninsula of Southwest Asia.  Saudi Arabia is bordered by Jordan on the northwest, Iraq on the north and northeast, Kuwait, Qatar, Bahrain, and the United Arab Emirates on the east, Oman on the southeast, and Yemen on the south. The Persian Gulf lies to the northeast and the Red Sea to its west. It has an estimated population of 34,218,169, and its size is approximately 2,150,000 square km (830,000 square miles).

The Kingdom is sometimes called "The Land of The Two Holy Mosques" in reference to Mecca and Medina, the two holiest places of Islam. The Kingdom was founded by Abdul-Aziz bin Saud, whose efforts began in 1902 when he captured the Al-Saud's ancestral home of Riyadh, and culminated in 1932 with the proclamation, and recognition of the Kingdom of Saudi Arabia.

Saudi Arabia is the world's leading petroleum exporter and petroleum exports fuel the Saudi economy. Oil accounts for more than 90 percent of exports and nearly 75 percent of government revenues, facilitating the creation of a welfare state, which the government has found difficult to fund during periods of low oil prices. Human rights groups such as Amnesty International and Human Rights Watch have repeatedly expressed concern about the state of human rights in Saudi Arabia, although these concerns have been dismissed by the Saudi government.

General reference 

 Pronunciation:
 Common English country name:  Saudi Arabia
 Official English country name:  The Kingdom of Saudi Arabia
 Adjectives: Saudi, Saudi Arabian
 Demonym(s):
 Etymology: Name of Saudi Arabia
 International rankings of Saudi Arabia
 ISO country codes:  SA, SAU, 682
 ISO region codes:  See ISO 3166-2:SA
 Internet country code top-level domain:  .sa

Geography of Saudi Arabia 

Geography of Saudi Arabia

 Saudi Arabia is: a country
 Location:
 Northern Hemisphere and Eastern Hemisphere
 Eurasia
 Asia
 Southwest Asia
 Middle East
 Arabian Peninsula
 Time zone: Saudi Arabia Standard Time (UTC+03)
 Extreme points of Saudi Arabia
 High:  Jabal Sawda 
 Low:  Persian Gulf and Red Sea 0 m
 Land boundaries:  4,431 km
 1,458 km
 814 km
 744 km
 676 km
 457 km
 222 km
 60 km
 Coastline:  2,640 km
 Population of Saudi Arabia: 34,218,169  - 40th most populous country

 Area of Saudi Arabia: 2,149,690 km2
 Atlas of Saudi Arabia

Environment of Saudi Arabia 

Environment of Saudi Arabia
 Climate of Saudi Arabia
 Renewable energy in Saudi Arabia
 Geology of Saudi Arabia
Protected areas of Saudi Arabia
Biosphere reserves in Saudi Arabia
 National parks of Saudi Arabia
 Wildlife of Saudi Arabia
 Fauna of Saudi Arabia
 Birds of Saudi Arabia
 Mammals of Saudi Arabia
 Saudi Environmental Society

Natural geographic features of Saudi Arabia 

 Glaciers of Saudi Arabia
 Islands of Saudi Arabia
 Lakes of Saudi Arabia
 Mountains of Saudi Arabia
 Volcanoes in Saudi Arabia
Rivers of Saudi Arabia
Waterfalls of Saudi Arabia
Valleys of Saudi Arabia
World Heritage Sites in Saudi Arabia
Al-Ahsa Oasis
Al-Hijr Archaeological Site (Madâin Sâlih)
At-Turaif District in ad-Dir'iyah
Historic Jeddah
Rock Art in the Hail Region

Regions of Saudi Arabia 

Regions of Saudi Arabia

Ecoregions of Saudi Arabia 

List of ecoregions in Saudi Arabia

Administrative divisions of Saudi Arabia 

Administrative divisions of Saudi Arabia
 Emirates of Saudi Arabia
 Governorates of Saudi Arabia
 Municipalities of Saudi Arabia

Emirates of Saudi Arabia 

Emirates of Saudi Arabia

Governorates of Saudi Arabia 

Governorates of Saudi Arabia

Municipalities of Saudi Arabia 

Municipalities of Saudi Arabia
 Capital of Saudi Arabia: Riyadh

Demography of Saudi Arabia 

Demographics of Saudi Arabia

Government and politics of Saudi Arabia 

Politics of Saudi Arabia
 Form of government:
 Capital of Saudi Arabia: Riyadh
 Elections in Saudi Arabia
 Political parties in Saudi Arabia

Branches of the government of Saudi Arabia

Executive branch of the government of Saudi Arabia 
 Head of state: King of Saudi Arabia
 Head of government: Prime Minister of Saudi Arabia
 Cabinet of Saudi Arabia

Legislative branch of the government of Saudi Arabia 

 Consultative Assembly of Saudi Arabia

Judicial branch of the government of Saudi Arabia 

Judiciary of Saudi Arabia
 Supreme Judicial Council of Saudi Arabia

Foreign relations of Saudi Arabia 

Foreign relations of Saudi Arabia
 Diplomatic missions in Saudi Arabia

International organization membership 
The Kingdom of Saudi Arabia is a member of:

 The executive board of UNESCO for 2019-2023

African Development Bank Group (AfDB) (nonregional member)
Arab Bank for Economic Development in Africa (ABEDA)
Arab Fund for Economic and Social Development (AFESD)
Arab Monetary Fund (AMF)
Bank for International Settlements (BIS)
Cooperation Council for the Arab States of the Gulf (GCC)
Food and Agriculture Organization (FAO)
Group of 77 (G77)
Group of Twenty Finance Ministers and Central Bank Governors (G20)
International Atomic Energy Agency (IAEA)
International Bank for Reconstruction and Development (IBRD)
International Chamber of Commerce (ICC)
International Civil Aviation Organization (ICAO)
International Criminal Police Organization (Interpol)
International Federation of Red Cross and Red Crescent Societies (IFRCS)
International Finance Corporation (IFC)
International Fund for Agricultural Development (IFAD)
International Hydrographic Organization (IHO)
International Labour Organization (ILO)
International Maritime Organization (IMO)
International Mobile Satellite Organization (IMSO)
International Monetary Fund (IMF)
International Olympic Committee (IOC)
International Organization for Standardization (ISO)
International Red Cross and Red Crescent Movement (ICRM)
International Telecommunication Union (ITU)

International Telecommunications Satellite Organization (ITSO)
Inter-Parliamentary Union (IPU)
Islamic Development Bank (IDB)
League of Arab States (LAS)
Multilateral Investment Guarantee Agency (MIGA)
Nonaligned Movement (NAM)
Organisation of Islamic Cooperation (OIC)
Organisation for the Prohibition of Chemical Weapons (OPCW)
Organization of American States (OAS) (observer)
Organization of Arab Petroleum Exporting Countries (OAPEC)
Organization of Petroleum Exporting Countries (OPEC)
Permanent Court of Arbitration (PCA)
United Nations (UN)
United Nations Conference on Trade and Development (UNCTAD)
United Nations Educational, Scientific, and Cultural Organization (UNESCO)
United Nations Industrial Development Organization (UNIDO)
United Nations Relief and Works Agency for Palestine Refugees in the Near East (UNRWA)
Universal Postal Union (UPU)
World Customs Organization (WCO)
World Federation of Trade Unions (WFTU)
World Health Organization (WHO)
World Intellectual Property Organization (WIPO)
World Meteorological Organization (WMO)
World Tourism Organization (UNWTO)
World Trade Organization (WTO)

Law and order in Saudi Arabia 

 Capital punishment in Saudi Arabia
 Constitution of Saudi Arabia
 Crime in Saudi Arabia
 Human rights in Saudi Arabia
 LGBT rights in Saudi Arabia
 Freedom of religion in Saudi Arabia
 Women's rights in Saudi Arabia
 Gender segregation in Saudi Arabia
 Law enforcement in Saudi Arabia
 Royal Saudi Arabia Police Force
 Committee for the Promotion of Virtue and the Prevention of Vice
 Mutaween (religious police)

Military of Saudi Arabia 

Military of Saudi Arabia
 Command
 Commander-in-chief:
 Ministry of Defence of Saudi Arabia
 Forces
 Defense Forces
 Army of Saudi Arabia
 Navy of Saudi Arabia
 Air Force of Saudi Arabia
 Royal Saudi Air Defense
 Royal Saudi Strategic Missile Force
 Guard Forces
Royal Guard
National Guard 
 Military ranks of Saudi Arabia

Local government in Saudi Arabia 

Local government in Saudi Arabia

History of Saudi Arabia 

History of Saudi Arabia
 Timeline of the history of Saudi Arabia
 Ancient towns in Saudi Arabia
 Economic history of Saudi Arabia
 History of the oil industry in Saudi Arabia
 Military history of Saudi Arabia
 Modern history of Saudi Arabia

Culture of Saudi Arabia 

Culture of Saudi Arabia
 Architecture of Saudi Arabia
 Tallest buildings in Saudi Arabia
 Cuisine of Saudi Arabia
Festivals in Saudi Arabia
 Languages of Saudi Arabia
 Media in Saudi Arabia
 Newspapers in Saudi Arabia
 Television in Saudi Arabia
 National symbols of Saudi Arabia
 Emblem of Saudi Arabia
 Flag of Saudi Arabia
 National anthem of Saudi Arabia
 People of Saudi Arabia
 Polygamy in Saudi Arabia
 Prostitution in Saudi Arabia
 Public holidays in Saudi Arabia
 Records of Saudi Arabia
 Religion in Saudi Arabia
 Buddhism in Saudi Arabia
 Christianity in Saudi Arabia
 Hinduism in Saudi Arabia
 Irreligion in Saudi Arabia
 Islam in Saudi Arabia
 Shia Islam in Saudi Arabia
 Ahmadiyya in Saudi Arabia
 Judaism in Saudi Arabia
 Sikhism in Saudi Arabia
 World Heritage Sites in Saudi Arabia
 Mada'in Saleh
 Rock Art in the Ha'il Region

Art in Saudi Arabia 
 Art in Saudi Arabia
 Cinema of Saudi Arabia
 Literature of Saudi Arabia
 Music of Saudi Arabia
 Theatre in Saudi Arabia

Sports in Saudi Arabia 

Sport in Saudi Arabia
 List of sports venues in Saudi Arabia
 Football in Saudi Arabia
 Saudi Arabia national football team
 Saudi Arabian Football Federation
 Saudi Arabia at the Olympics
 Sports venues in Saudi Arabia

Economy and infrastructure of Saudi Arabia 

Economy of Saudi Arabia
 Economic rank, by nominal GDP (2018): 18th
Member of Group of Twenty (G20)
 Agriculture in Saudi Arabia
 Banking in Saudi Arabia
 Banks in Saudi Arabia
 Communications in Saudi Arabia
 Internet in Saudi Arabia
 Telephone numbers in Saudi Arabia
 Companies of Saudi Arabia
Currency of Saudi Arabia: Riyal
ISO 4217: SAR
 Energy in Saudi Arabia
 Nuclear energy in Saudi Arabia
 Oil industry in Saudi Arabia
 Solar power in Saudi Arabia
 Health care in Saudi Arabia
 Mining in Saudi Arabia
 Saudi Arabian Stock Exchange
Saudi Parallel Market (Nomu)
 Tourism in Saudi Arabia
 Transport in Saudi Arabia
 Airports in Saudi Arabia
 Rail transport in Saudi Arabia
 Roads in Saudi Arabia
 Water supply and sanitation in Saudi Arabia
 Irrigation in Saudi Arabia

Education in Saudi Arabia 

Education in Saudi Arabia
 Universities and colleges in Saudi Arabia

See also 

Saudi Arabia
Index of Saudi Arabia-related articles
List of international rankings
List of Saudi Arabia-related topics
Member state of the Group of Twenty Finance Ministers and Central Bank Governors
Member state of the United Nations
Outline of Asia
Outline of geography

References

External links 

 Online Newspapers in Saudi Arabia
 Arab versus Asian migrant workers in the GCC countries
 The New York Times "Asterisk Aside, First National Vote for Saudis" 2005-02-10
 BBC "Q&A: Saudi municipal elections"
 BBC "Saudis' first exercise in democracy"
 Hesbah.com site of Authority for the Promotion of Virtue and Prevention of Vice Forum for Saudis to anonymously report "un-Islamic" activities to the Mutaween.
 "Saudi says US human trafficking criticism unfounded"
 "Documentation of Internet Filtering in Saudi Arabia"
The Ideology of Terrorism and Violence in Saudi Arabia: Origins, Reasons and Solution
  (844 KB)

 Government
 Saudi Arabian Information Resource, Saudi Ministry Education
 Saudi Arabian Information Resource, Saudi Ministry of Media
 Royal Embassy of Saudi Arabia in Washington, DC
 Overviews;
 BBC News Country Profile - Saudi Arabia
 CIA World Factbook - Saudi Arabia
 Congressional Research Service (CRS) Reports regarding Saudi Arabia
 US State Department - Saudi Arabia includes Background Notes, Country Study and major reports
 U.S. Energy Information Administration - Country Energy Profiles - Saudi Arabia

 Directories
 SAMIRAD website - Saudi Arabia Market Information and Directory directory category
 Arab Gateway - Saudi Arabia
 
 Yahoo! - Saudi Arabia directory category
 Datarabia - Saudi Royal Family, Business Directory - Saudi Arabia directory category

 Other links
 Mark Steel: Why does Saudi Arabia need military aid?
 Saudi Arabia: Historical Demographic Data Factsheet
 Saudi Match Point - a novel set in contemporary Saudi Arabia
 Asinah - Saudi Arabia
 British Business Group, Jeddah
 eSaudi.info Information about Saudi Arabia Historical
 U.S. Department of Justice: Foreign Agents Registration Act
 

Saudi Arabia

 
Economic history of Saudi Arabia
Economic history
History